John D. Marks (born 1943) is the founder and former president of Search for Common Ground (SFCG), a non-profit organization based in Washington, DC that focuses on international conflict management programming. Marks now acts as a Senior Adviser to SFCG. He is also a former Foreign Service Officer of the U.S. Department of State and co-authored the 1974 controversial non-fiction  book The CIA and the Cult of Intelligence with Victor Marchetti.

Biography
Marks is a graduate of Phillips Academy and Cornell University. He worked for five years with the State Department, first in Vietnam and then as an analyst and staff assistant to the Director of the Bureau of Intelligence and Research. After leaving the State Department, he became Executive Assistant for foreign policy to US Senator Clifford Case (R-NJ), responsible within the Senator's office for passage of the Case–Church Amendment, which eventually cut off funding for the Vietnam War. He also worked with Marchetti on a book about the need to reform the Central Intelligence Agency.

The CIA and the Cult of Intelligence

The CIA and the Cult of Intelligence was completed in 1973. CIA officials read the manuscript and told Marchetti and Marks that they had to remove 339 passages, nearly a fifth of the book. After long negotiations the CIA yielded on 171 items. That left 168 censored passages. The publisher, Alfred A. Knopf, decided to go ahead and publish the book with blanks for those passages, and with the sections that the CIA had originally cut then restored printed in boldface.

The publication of Marchetti and Marks' censored book, which became a bestseller, raised concerns about the way the CIA was censoring information. It contributed to investigative reports by Seymour Hersh in The New York Times and the decision by Frank Church to establish the United States Senate Select Committee to Study Governmental Operations with Respect to Intelligence Activities in 1975. The report, Foreign and Military Intelligence, was published in 1976.

Documents obtained from the CIA by Marks under Freedom of Information in 1976 showed that, in 1953,  the CIA considered purchasing 10 kilograms of LSD, enough for 100 million doses. The proposed purchased aimed to stop other countries from controlling the supply. The documents showed that the CIA did purchase some quantities of LSD from Sandoz Laboratories in Switzerland.

Marks delivered a speech on the book at Turning Point 1977, the 1977 Libertarian Party National Convention held July 12-17 at the Sheraton-Palace Hotel in San Francisco, California.

The Search for the Manchurian Candidate
Marks' 1979 book, The Search for the Manchurian Candidate describes a wide range of CIA activities during the Cold War, including unethical drug experiments as part of a mind-control and chemical interrogation research program known as Project MKUltra. The book is based on 16,000 pages of CIA documents obtained under the Freedom of Information Act and many interviews, including those with retired members of the psychological division of the CIA, and the book describes some of the work of psychologists in this effort with a whole chapter on the Personality Assessment System.

Marks later became a fellow of Harvard's Institute of Politics and a visiting scholar at Harvard Law School. In 1982, Marks founded the Nuclear Network in Washington, DC, which was soon renamed Search for Common Ground.

From 1982 to 2014, Marks was President of Search for Common Ground, a non-profit conflict resolution organization. He also founded and headed Common Ground Productions. He wrote and produced The Shape of the Future, a four-part, TV documentary series that was simulcast on Israeli, Palestinian, and Arab satellite TV, and he is executive producer of The Team  TV and radio series in 17 countries and numerous other TV and radio programs.

Honors and accolades

John Marks is the recipient of numerous awards. These include:

Honorary Doctorate from the UN University of Peace (2010- with his wife, Susan Collin Marks)
The Marvin E. Johnson Diversity and Equity Award from the Association for Conflict Resolution (2010-with Susan Collin Marks) 
Senior Ashoka Fellow (2009) 
Social Entrepreneurship Award from the Skoll Foundation (2006-with Susan Collin Marks) 
The Temple Awards for Creative Altruism from the Institute of Noetic Sciences (2005-with Susan Collin Marks) 
Cultures of Peace Award from Psychologists for Social Responsibility (2002)
Wild School Award from Upland Hills School (2001-with Susan Collin Marks)

Works

Books
 The CIA and the Cult of Intelligence, with Victor Marchetti. New York: Alfred A. Knopf (1974). Full text.
 The CIA File, edited with Robert Borosage. New York: Grossman Publishers (1976). .
"Proceedings and papers presented at a conference The CIA and Covert Action held in Washington, Sept., 1974, sponsored by the Center for National Security Studies."
 The Search for the Manchurian Candidate: The CIA and Mind Control. New York: Times Books (1979).
 Common Ground on Terrorism: Soviet-American Cooperation Against the Politics of Terror, edited with Igor Beliaev. New York: W. W. Norton (1991). . .

Articles
 "Inside the CIA: The Clandestine Mentality," with Victor Marchetti. Ramparts Magazine (Jul. 1974), pp. 21-25, 48, 50, 52.
 "How to Spot a Spook." Washington Monthly (Nov. 1974), pp. 5-11.
 "One Man We Remembered." Washington Monthly (Jun. 1975), pp. 26-29.
 "Sex, Drugs, and the CIA: The Shocking Search for an 'Ultimate Weapon'." Saturday Review (Feb. 3, 1979), pp. 12-16.

References

External links
 

1943 births
Living people
American political writers
American male non-fiction writers
Harvard Fellows
Place of birth missing (living people)
Cornell University alumni
Nonviolence advocates
Ashoka USA Fellows